EMI Records Japan was a Japanese record label which operated as a sublabel of Universal Music Japan. Established in April 2013, it was the successor of its previous entity as a company, EMI Music Japan. The sublabel's headquarters was located at Universal Music Japan's main office at Aoyama, Minato, Tokyo. In February 2014, the sublabel had been divided into two separate sublabels, EMI Records, which contains the combined Nayutawave Records and more than half of the EMI Records Japan roster, and EMI R, which consists of the remaining EMI Records Japan artists. In July 2014, EMI R was renamed to Virgin Records.

History
After the European Commission approved the acquisition of EMI by Universal Music Group on September 21, 2012, restructuring and rebranding of several EMI labels under Universal Music followed on September 28, 2012, as the merger was approved. On January 15, 2013, Universal Music Japan president Kazuhiko Koike took over as CEO of EMI Music Japan, effectively controlling both companies until its integration into Universal Music Japan as a sublabel on April 1, 2013, as EMI Records Japan. Koike, meanwhile, hadstated that the merger had a bad effect in terms of its international repertoire and employment. Artists from the former company were able to continue releasing material under Universal Music but still maintaining the catalog code TOCT. As of October 2013, the TOCT catalogue was no longer in use and was replaced by TYCT (for the original EMI Records artists) and UPCH (for Nayutawave Records artists absorbed by EMI). In February 2014, Universal Music Japan did a large-scale sub-label reorganization, with more than half of EMI Records Japan artists transferred to Nayutawave Records, renaming the latter as EMI Records. The remainder of the roster were moved to another sub-label, called EMI R. By June 2014, the EMI artists that were transferred to Nayutawave to form the EMI Records unit began using the UPCH catalogue code. On April 14, 2014, Universal Music Japan announced that EMI R and sublabels Universal International and Delicious Deli Records will be having their joint partnership by forming Virgin Music, with Universal International's EMI label distribution be merged later on. In July 2014, EMI R was once again renamed to Virgin Records. Virgin Records was subsequently tied-up with another UMJ sublabel Delicious Deli Records to form an umbrella label named Virgin Music.

References

External links
  (EMI R)
  (EMI Records)
 

Japan
Virgin Records
Japanese record labels
2013 establishments in Japan
Record labels established in 2013
EMI Records Japan
Labels distributed by Universal Music Group
Record labels disestablished in 2014
Defunct record labels of Japan

ja:EMIレコーズ・ジャパン